Jaan Tomp (13 May 1882 – 1943) was an Estonian journalist. He was born in Uue-Võidu vald, Viljandi County. From 1905–1908 he worked for Kodumaa, followed by Kodumaa Hääl, Maa, Meie Kodu and Meie Kodumaa.
In 1919-1920 he was chairman of the Estonian Journalists' Union, and was an honorary member from 1934.
From 1918 until 1937 he was an editor of Vaba Maa.

References

1882 births
1943 deaths
People from Viljandi Parish
People from the Governorate of Livonia
Estonian journalists
Estonian non-fiction writers
20th-century Estonian writers
Estonian male writers
20th-century journalists
Male non-fiction writers